Eric Martin (born July 21, 1991) is a former Canadian football defensive end for the Toronto Argonauts of the Canadian Football League. He played college football at Nebraska.

Professional career

New Orleans Saints
On April 28, 2013, he signed with the New Orleans Saints as an undrafted free agent.

Cleveland Browns
On August 28, 2013, he was claimed off waivers by the Cleveland Browns.

New England Patriots
On December 29, 2014, the New England Patriots signed Martin to their practice squad. Martin won Super Bowl XLIX with the Patriots after they defeated the defending champion Seattle Seahawks 28-24. Martin made the 2015 53-man roster out of camp, but on September 12, 2015, the Patriots waived Martin. They re-signed him to their practice squad on October 1, 2015.

On November 12, 2015, he was promoted to the active roster. On November 27, he was waived. Martin was re-signed to the Patriots' practice squad on December 9, 2015, then promoted to the active roster three days later.

On December 19, 2015, it was announced Martin was waived from the Patriots roster with an injury designation to make room for fullback Joey Iosefa. Martin cleared waivers and reverted to injured reserve on December 21, 2015.

Martin was waived by the Patriots on April 14, 2016.

Toronto Argonauts
On October 3, 2016, Martin signed with the Toronto Argonauts of the Canadian Football League.

References

External links
Toronto Argonauts bio
Cleveland Browns bio
Nebraska Cornhuskers bio

Living people
1991 births
Nebraska Cornhuskers football players
American football outside linebackers
New Orleans Saints players
Cleveland Browns players
New England Patriots players
People from Moreno Valley, California
Players of American football from California
Sportspeople from Riverside County, California
American football defensive ends
Canadian football linebackers
American players of Canadian football
Toronto Argonauts players